Anolis heterodermus, the flat Andes anole, is a species of lizard in the family Dactyloidae. The species is found in Colombia and Ecuador.

References

Anoles
Reptiles of Colombia
Reptiles of Ecuador
Reptiles described in 1851
Taxa named by Auguste Duméril